Bill C. Bellamy (born December 9, 1949) is an American politician who was a member of the Oregon House of Representatives.

Bellamy was born in 1949 at Goldendale, Washington and attended Oregon State University. He worked as a vocational agriculture instructor.

References

1949 births
Living people
Republican Party members of the Oregon House of Representatives
Oregon State University alumni
People from Goldendale, Washington
People from Jefferson County, Oregon